Rashad Lawrence (born June 10, 1992) is an American football wide receiver. He played college football at Northwestern.

College career
Lawrence played for the Northwestern Wildcats where he excelled in his junior year where he was the second player on the team with 34 receptions. In his senior year, he had a game against Wisconsin with eight career-high receptions.

Professional career

Washington Redskins
Lawrence signed with the Washington Redskins as an undrafted free agent on May 15, 2014. He was waived by the Redskins on August 26, 2014.

Chicago Bears
On November 11, 2014, Lawrence was signed to the Chicago Bears practice squad. He signed a reserve/future contract with the Bears on December 29, 2014.

On September 5, 2015, Lawrence was waived by the Bears.

Jacksonville Jaguars
On September 8, 2015, Lawrence was signed to the Jacksonville Jaguars practice squad. He was promoted to the active roster on December 5, 2015. He was released on December 15, 2015 and re-signed to the practice squad. He signed a reserve/future contract on January 5, 2016.

On September 3, 2016, he was waived by the Jaguars and signed to the practice squad the next day. He was released by the Jaguars on November 10, 2016.

New Orleans Saints
On January 17, 2017, Lawrence signed a reserve/future contract with the New Orleans Saints. He was waived on August 12, 2017.

Miami Dolphins
On August 15, 2017, Lawrence was signed by the Miami Dolphins. He was waived on September 2, 2017.

Hamilton Tiger-Cats
Played 10 games in 2018 for Tiger-Cats in CFL. Handled Wide Receiver and Kick Return duties. Had 17 catches out of 27 attempts for 131 yards. Longest for 19 yards and 7.7 yard average. Returned 6 kickoffs for 101 yards and 16.8 yard average. Longest for 26 yards.

Football Coaching Career
Wide receiver coach for Allen D. Nease High School Football Team in Ponte Vedra, Florida (2019-2020).

Personal
Lawrence is the founder and lead trainer of Solid Ground Athletics, a sports performance group that develops athletes in North and Central FL. He mentors and trains a diverse group of athletes ranging from elementary school to the NFL.

References

External links
Northwestern Wildcats bio

1992 births
Living people
American football wide receivers
Northwestern Wildcats football players
Washington Redskins players
Chicago Bears players
Jacksonville Jaguars players
New Orleans Saints players
Miami Dolphins players
Hamilton Tiger-Cats players
Players of American football from Orlando, Florida
Players of Canadian football from Orlando, Florida
Canadian football wide receivers